Yamakanmardi  is a village in the southern state of Karnataka, India. It is located in the Hukeri taluk of Belgaum district in Karnataka.

Demographics
As of the 2001 Indian census, Yamakanmardi had a population of 8,545, with 4,288 males and 4,257 females.

See also
 Belgaum
 Districts of Karnataka

References

External links
 http://Belgaum.nic.in/

Villages in Belagavi district